Theobald III of Blois (French: Thibaut) (1012–1089) was count of Blois, Meaux and Troyes. He was captured in 1044 by Geoffrey II, Count of Anjou, and exchanged the county of Touraine for his freedom. Theobald used his nephew's involvement with the Norman invasion of England, to gain authority over the County of Champagne. He died in 1089.

Inherits Blois
Theobald was son of Odo II, Count of Blois and Ermengarde of Auvergne. Upon his father's death in 1037, Theobald inherited amongst others the counties of Blois, Tours, Chartres. Châteaudun and Sancerre, and also in Champagne: Château-Thierry, Provins and St. Florentin. His brother Stephen inherited the counties of Meaux, Troyes and Vitry-le-François. By 1044, Geoffrey Martel, the Count of Anjou, was besieging Tours and Theobald responded by attempting to relieve the city. They met in battle at Nouy and Theobald was captured and had to give up the county of Touraine in order to regain his freedom. From then on the centre of power for the House of Blois moved to Champagne.

In 1054, Theobald recognized the Holy Roman Emperor, Henry III as his liege which precipitated a meeting at Ivois between Henry I and the emperor. Theobald found ways to become close to the royal court again and gained political influence and began calling himself, Count Palatine.

Gains Champagne
Theobald's nephew, Odo, Count of Champagne joined the army of William the Conqueror and participated in the Norman conquest of England.  Theobald used his nephew's absence and his own influence at court to gain control over Odo's possessions in Champagne. He had gained a position of considerable power, which increased when he married the daughter of Ralph IV of Valois. From 1074 onward, he left his son Henry in control of Blois, Châteaudun and Chartres.

Death
Following Theobald's death in 1089, Philip I, King of France, was able to arrange for Blois and Champagne to be divided between Theobald's sons.

Family and children
Theobald's first wife Gersent of Le Mans, daughter of Herbert I, Count of Maine, who bore him one child:
Stephen, Count of Blois
His second wife Alix de Crepy (Adela) or Adele of Valois, daughter of Ralph IV of Valois and Adélaide of Bar-sur-Aube, bore four children:
Philip, who became bishop of Châlons-sur-Marne
Odo, who inherited possessions in Champagne (Troyes). He died in 1093, leaving the possessions to his brother Hugh.
Hugh, who became the first to be called count of Champagne.

References

Sources

House of Blois
Theobald III
Counts of Champagne
Counts of Meaux
Counts of Troyes
Counts of Chartres
Counts of Châteaudun
Counts of Tours
Counts of Reims
Counts of Provins
Counts of Château-Thierry
Counts of Sancerre
1012 births
1089 deaths